Onomastus is a genus of Asian jumping spiders (family Salticidae) that was first described by Eugène Louis Simon in 1900. It is the only genus in the subfamily Onomastinae.

Description
Onomastus species are delicate, translucent spiders, with long legs compared to most other members of the family Salticidae. Males have highly complex palpal bulbs. Two clades have been distinguished: in species from Southeast Asia, the palpal bulb has a broad conductor; in those from South Asia it has a medial branch on the median apophysis. Like species of the subfamilies Lyssomaninae and Asemoneinae, the anterior lateral eyes form a separate row from the anterior median eyes. The genus was originally diagnosed on the basis of the arrangement of the eyes.

Taxonomy
The genus Onomastus was first described by Eugène Simon in 1900. He placed it in the "Attidae", the name he then used for the family Salticidae. It was later placed in a broadly defined subfamily Lyssomaninae, although by the 1980s it was agreed that this subfamily consisted of three groups. When Wayne Maddison divided the subfamily into three in 2015, the genus was placed in its own subfamily, Onomastinae.

Species
, it contains seventeen species, found only in Asia:
Onomastus chenae Lin & Li, 2020 – China
Onomastus complexipalpis Wanless, 1980 – Borneo
Onomastus corbetensis Benjamin & Kanesharatnam, 2016 – Sri Lanka
Onomastus danum Prószyński & Deeleman-Reinhold, 2013 – Borneo
Onomastus indra Benjamin, 2010 – India
Onomastus jamestaylori Benjamin & Kanesharatnam, 2016 – Sri Lanka
Onomastus kaharian Benjamin, 2010 – Thailand, Indonesia (Borneo)
Onomastus kanoi Ono, 1995 – Japan (Okinawa)
Onomastus maskeliya Benjamin & Kanesharatnam, 2016 – Sri Lanka
Onomastus nigricaudus Simon, 1900 (type) – Sri Lanka
Onomastus nigrimaculatus Zhang & Li, 2005 – China, Thailand
Onomastus patellaris Simon, 1900 – India
Onomastus pethiyagodai Benjamin, 2010 – Sri Lanka
Onomastus quinquenotatus Simon, 1900 – Sri Lanka
Onomastus rattotensis Benjamin, 2010 – Sri Lanka
Onomastus simoni Zabka, 1985 – Vietnam
Onomastus subchenae C. Wang, W. H. Wang & Peng, 2021 – China

References

External links

 Photograph of Onomastus sp.

Salticidae genera
Salticidae
Spiders of Asia
Taxa named by Eugène Simon